Mellish Road Methodist Chapel was a grade II listed Methodist chapel in Mellish Road, Walsall, England, built in 1910.

The building was of limestone ashlar, with some exposed brick, and cost £3,600.

In the 1990s, subsidence caused by the flooding of disused mine-workings beneath the chapel caused a significant crack to appear in its walls. It was declared unsafe and abandoned. An arson attack in 2008 further weakened it, and – after being de-listed – it was demolished in 2011.

During demolition, its  octagonal limestone spire was carefully dismantled and later, in 2015, offered for sale, with the initial asking price of £130,000.

The chapel's records are in the Walsall Local History Centre.

References

External links 

 National Archives entry

Grade II listed churches in the West Midlands (county)
Destroyed churches in England
Buildings and structures in Walsall